Nvidia Jetson is a series of embedded computing boards from Nvidia. The Jetson TK1, TX1 and TX2 models all carry a Tegra processor (or SoC) from Nvidia that integrates an ARM architecture central processing unit (CPU). Jetson is a low-power system and is designed for accelerating machine learning applications.

Hardware

The Jetson family includes the following boards:
 In late April 2014, Nvidia shipped the Nvidia Jetson TK1 development board containing a Tegra K1 SoC in the T124 variant and running Ubuntu Linux.
 The Nvidia Jetson TX1 development board bears a Tegra X1 of model T210.
 The Nvidia Jetson TX2 board bears a Tegra X2 of microarchitecture GP10B (SoC type T186 or very similar). This board and the associated development platform was announced in March 2017 as a compact card design for low power scenarios, e.g. for the use in smaller camera drones. A matrix describing a set of performance modes was provided by the media along with that. Further a TX2i variant, said to be rugged and suitable for industrial use cases, is mentioned.
 The Nvidia Jetson Xavier was announced as a development kit in end of August 2018. Indications were given that a 20x acceleration for certain application cases compared to predecessor devices should be expected, and that the application power efficiency is 10x improved. Nvidia Jetson Xavier NX has a 6-core NVIDIA Carmel ARM v8.2.
 The Nvidia Jetson AGX Xavier is the 8-core version on the same core architecture (Carmel Armv8.2).
 The Nvidia Jetson Nano was announced as a development system in mid-March 2019 The intended market is for hobbyist robotics due to the low price point. The final specs expose the board being sort of a power-optimized, stripped-down version of what a full Tegra X1 system would mean. Comparing in more detail only half of the CPU (only 4x A57 @ 1.43 GHz) and GPU (128 cores of Maxwell generation @ 921 MHz) cores are present and only half of the maximum possible RAM is attached (4 GB LPDDR4 @ 64 bit + 1.6 GHz = 25.6 GB/s) whilst the available or usable interfacing is determined by the baseboard design and is further subject of implementation decisions and specifics in an end user specific design for an application case.
The Nvidia Jetson Nano Developer Kit is an AI computer for makers, learners, and developers that brings the power of modern artificial intelligence to a low-power, easy-to-use platform, to start quickly with out-of-the-box support for many popular peripherals, add-ons, and ready-to-use projects.
In September 2022 Nvidia announced the Jetson Orin Nano. The modules have the same 260-pin SO-DIMM connector and 69.6 mm x 45 mm dimensions, and come in two variants. The 4GB variant provides 20 Sparse or 10 Dense TOPs, using a 512-core Ampere GPU with 16 Tensor cores, while the 8GB variant doubles those numbers to 40/20 TOPs, a 1024-core GPU and 16 Tensor cores. Both have 6 Arm Cortex-A78AE cores. The 4GB module starts at $199 and the 8GB variant for $299, when purchasing 1000 units.

Performance 
The published performance modes of the Nvidia Jetson TX2 are as follows. 

Jetson TX2 also has 5 power modes, numbered 0 through 4 as published by NVIDIA. The default mode is mode 3 (MAX-P).

The published operation modes of the Nvidia Jetson Nano are:

Versions
There are various versions of the Jetson board available. Some of them are:

Software
Various operating systems and software might be able to run on the Jetson board series.

Linux
JetPack is a Software Development Kit (SDK) from Nvidia for their Jetson board series. It includes the Linux for Tegra (L4T) operating system and other tools. The official Nvidia download page bears an entry for JetPack 3.2 (uploaded there on 2018-03-08) that states:

RedHawk Linux is a high-performance RTOS available for the Jetson platform, along with associated NightStar real-time development tools, CUDA/GPU enhancements, and a framework for hardware-in-the-loop and man-in-the-loop simulations.

QNX
The QNX operating system also available for the Jetson platform, though it is not widely announced. There are success reports of installing and running specific QNX packages on certain Nvidia Jetson board variants. Namely the package qnx-V3Q-23.16.01 that is seemingly in parts based on Nvidia's Vibrante Linux distribution is reported to run on the Jetson TK1 Pro board.

See also
 Computer vision
 Raspberry Pi
 Movidius neural compute stick

References

ARM-based single-board computers
Linux-based devices
Nvidia products

ru:Nvidia#Jetson